Sex-O MiXXX-O is a remix album released on September 29, 2009, by the Revolting Cocks on 13th Planet Records. All of the original songs can be found on the band's previous album, Sex-O Olympic-O.

Track listing

Personnel
See original album credits to Sex-O Olympic-O

References

Revolting Cocks albums
2009 remix albums
Albums produced by Al Jourgensen
Industrial remix albums